The 1993 NCAA Division I baseball tournament was played at the end of the 1993 NCAA Division I baseball season to determine the national champion of college baseball.  The tournament concluded with eight teams competing in the College World Series, a double-elimination tournament in its forty seventh year.  Eight regional competitions were held to determine the participants in the final event.  Each region was composed of six teams, resulting in 48 teams participating in the tournament at the conclusion of their regular season, and in some cases, after a conference tournament.  The forty-seventh tournament's champion was LSU, coached by Skip Bertman.  The Most Outstanding Player was Todd Walker of LSU.

Regionals
The opening rounds of the tournament were played across eight regional sites across the country, each consisting of a six-team field. Each regional tournament is double-elimination, however region brackets are variable depending on the number of teams remaining after each round. The winners of each regional advanced to the College World Series.

Bold indicates winner.

Atlantic Regional
at Atlanta, GA

Central I Regional
at College Station, TX

Central II Regional
at Austin, TX

East Regional
at Tallahassee, FL

Mideast Regional
at Knoxville, TN

Midwest Regional
at Stillwater, OK

South Regional
at Baton Rouge, LA

West Regional
at Tempe, AZ

College World Series
Texas and Texas A&M became the last schools to represent the Southwest Conference in the CWS. The SWC folded following the 1996 baseball season, with membership split among the Big 12, Conference USA and the WAC.

Participants

Results

Bracket

Game results

All-Tournament Team
The following players were members of the College World Series All-Tournament Team.

Notable players
 Arizona State: Jacob Cruz, Paul Lo Duca, Cody McKay, Antone Williamson
 Kansas: Jeff Berblinger
 Long Beach State: Gabe Gonzalez, Jeff Liefer
 LSU: Russ Johnson, Brett Laxton, Armando Rios, Mike Sirotka, Todd Walker
 Oklahoma State: Sal Bando, Jr.
 Texas: Brooks Kieschnick, Stephen Larkin, J.D. Smart
 Texas A&M: Chris Clemons, Jeff Granger, Trey Moore, Kelly Wunsch
 Wichita State: Casey Blake, Jaime Bluma, Darren Dreifort

See also
 1993 NCAA Division I softball tournament
 1993 NCAA Division II baseball tournament
 1993 NCAA Division III baseball tournament
 1993 NAIA World Series

References

NCAA Division I Baseball Championship
1993 NCAA Division I baseball season
Baseball in Austin, Texas